Fabian Carrizo (born 27 July 1966 in Argentina) is an Argentinean retired footballer.

References

Argentine footballers
Living people
Association football defenders
Association football midfielders
1966 births
Club Atlético Independiente footballers
Club Atlético Huracán footballers
San Lorenzo de Almagro footballers